Guilherme Mendes Ribeiro (born 3 August 2000), commonly known as Guilherme, is a Brazilian footballer who currently plays as a forward for Cruzeiro, on loan from Ituano.

Career statistics

Club

Notes

References

2000 births
Living people
Brazilian footballers
Association football forwards
Campeonato Brasileiro Série D players
Ituano FC players
Cruzeiro Esporte Clube players